Hans Andreas "Stöveln" Öberg (21 November 1926 – 9 March 2009) was a Swedish ice hockey and bandy player: He represented his country at the 1952 Winter Olympics in Oslo, winning the bronze medal in the team competition. He also played on the Swedish team that finished fourth in the competition four years later at the 1956 Cortina d'Ampezzo Olympics. He was the brother of future Olympic silver medallist Carl-Göran Öberg. He played club hockey for Gävle Godtemplares IK, with whom he won the Guldpucken award in 1957, a year after his 1952 international teammate Åke Lassas. Öberg also played football and bandy, and won the Swedish bandy championship in 1959 with Skutskärs IF.

References

1926 births
2009 deaths
Ice hockey players at the 1952 Winter Olympics
Ice hockey players at the 1956 Winter Olympics
Medalists at the 1952 Winter Olympics
Olympic bronze medalists for Sweden
Olympic ice hockey players of Sweden
Olympic medalists in ice hockey
People from Gävle
Skutskärs IF players
Swedish bandy players
Swedish ice hockey players
Sportspeople from Gävleborg County